Huldremose Woman, or  Huldre Fen Woman, is a female bog body recovered in 1879 from a peat bog near Ramten, Jutland, Denmark. Analysis by Carbon 14 dating indicates that she lived during the Iron Age, sometime between 160 BCE and 340 CE. The mummified remains are exhibited at the National Museum of Denmark. The elaborate clothing worn by Huldremose Woman has been reconstructed and displayed at several museums.

Discovery
On 15 May 1879, the body was discovered by Niels Hansen, who was a worker in Ramten, Denmark, after digging a meter through the peat. Hansen then reported the find to a local teacher, who notified police as well as a pharmacist, who moved the body to a nearby barn for examination. The corpse was later surrendered to the national museum of Copenhagen.

Bioarchaeology
The body was found with the legs bent behind the back, with a nearly severed right arm. It is thought that the arm was damaged before she died. Apart from this, the corpse was well intact.

She had broken one of her legs, although it had healed before she died. Lacerations on one of the feet were thought to be post-mortem injuries inflicted by a shovel until they were then evaluated to have happened near the time of death. A rope was also found around the neck of the body, which suggests that she was hanged or strangled, although it may have been a necklace.

The body was reexamined non-invasively in 1990 and a dietary analysis was conducted in 1999. Radiography showed hair stubble on the scalp as well as the remains of the brain inside the cranium. The bones were demineralized, like many other bog bodies. The dietary analysis consisted of two samples of the gut contents, revealing that the woman's final meal had been rye bread.

Clothing and Textile Analysis

Unlike many other bog bodies, which are often found naked, the Huldremose Woman was found clothed with an array of accessories. Analysis of these items, including the rare evidence of plant fiber textile, has shown that peoples of the Scandinavian Early Iron Age had knowledge of and used a wide but previously unrecognized range of textile weaving and dyeing technologies, as well as  animal skin technologies. Her clothing has undergone extensive analysis by scientists at the Danish National Research Foundation’s Center of Textile Research and the National Museum of Denmark.

Huldremose woman wore several layered sheep skin capes with the wooly sides turned outward. These were of a complex construction:

"The two skin capes are made from well-prepared, curly fleeces. The outer cape is the largest, measuring 82 cm in height and 170 cm in width (Fig. 3). It is constructed of five primary, rectangular skin pieces, with two minor triangu- lar pieces under the yoke. Most pieces are from dark sheep skin, but on the fur side it has an insertion of four light goat skin pieces. On the flesh side it has an upper, front lining of dark sheep skin, which is a unique detail. The inner cape is slightly smaller, measuring 80 cm in height and 150 cm in width (Fig. 4). It is constructed of 7-8 primary sheep skin pieces, mostly rectangular and 22 secondary patches of sheep, goat and deer skin. Both capes have an asymmetrical design with a slanting neckline."

She also wore a wool plaid scarf, fastened by a bird bone pin, and a wool plaid skirt. Analyses by scientists at the National Museum of Denmark have shown that the color of the skirt was originally a blue or purple plaid, while the scarf was a red plaid. Chemical dye analyses showed the use of natural plant dyes and mordants and revealed that threads of at least 5 colors were woven to create the complex plaid patterns. Impressions on the skin of the Huldremose Woman, as well as a small amount of surviving degraded fibers, suggest that below her wool clothing she wore a white inner garment made from plant fibers that reached from the shoulders to below the knees. The type of plant fiber is unclear but other evidence from the time period suggest that it could have been made of nettle. A horn comb, a leather thong, and wool textile headband were found as well in what appears to be a pocket on the inner cape, made out of a bladder. 

In a 2009 study led by Dr. Karin Frei, Huldremose Woman and the set of clothing she wore underwent strontium isotopic analysis. This research indicated that the wool scarf has a local provenance. The wool skirt was found to be made of wool from at least 3 different provenances, including a local signature and a signature compatible with northern Scandinavia (e.g. Norway or Sweden). The plant fiber garment and the Huldremose Woman herself likely have a non-local origin, again showing compatibility with northern Scandinavia. The wool skirt was found to be made of wool from at least 3 different provenances, including a local signature and a signature compatible with northern Scandinavia (e.g. Norway or Sweden). In general, the study points to the possibility that textiles were either traded or brought as raw materials far more commonly and over longer distances than previously assumed.

See also
List of bog bodies

References

External links
 The woman from Huldremose at National Museum of Denmark
 Clothing and Hair Styles of the Bog People on archaeology.org

1879 archaeological discoveries
Archaeological discoveries in Denmark
Bog bodies
Year of death unknown
Year of birth missing